Mantophasma gamsbergense is a species of insect in the family Mantophasmatidae. It is endemic to Namibia.

Its type locality is Gamsberg in Windhoek District, Namibia.

References

Mantophasmatidae
Insects of Namibia
Endemic fauna of Namibia
Insects described in 2006